Cordulegaster erronea, the tiger spiketail, is a species of spiketail in the family Cordulegastridae. It is found in North America.

The IUCN conservation status of Cordulegaster erronea is "LC", least concern, with no immediate threat to the species' survival. The population is stable.

References

 Paulson, Dennis R., and Sidney W. Dunkle (1999). "A Checklist of North American Odonata including English name, etymology, type locality, and distribution". Slater Museum of Natural History, University of Puget Sound, Occasional Paper no. 56, 88.

Further reading

 Arnett, Ross H. (2000). American Insects: A Handbook of the Insects of America North of Mexico. CRC Press.

Cordulegastridae